The Champagne Stakes is an American Grade I Thoroughbred horse race for two-year-old horses. The race is run at a distance of one mile on the dirt at Belmont Park in October each year. Although the race is open to both colts and fillies, in practice it is New York's premier race for two-year-old colts and fillies enter the Frizette Stakes instead.

The race is a Road to the Kentucky Derby Prep Season qualifying race. The winner receives 10 points toward qualifying for the Kentucky Derby.

The race is also a part of the Breeders' Cup Challenge series. The winner automatically qualifies for the Breeders' Cup Juvenile.

The race was first run in 1867, and it is the oldest race of its kind in the United States. It was given the same name as the British Champagne Stakes which has been run annually since 1823 at the Doncaster Racecourse in South Yorkshire, England.

There was no Champagne Stakes run from 1910 through 1913, due to a legislated ban by the State of New York on parimutuel wagering, and no race was held in 1956.

Notable past winners who have gone on to success as three-year-olds or older include U.S. Triple Crown champions Seattle Slew, Count Fleet, and Secretariat however; Secretariat was disqualified from the race because of a questionable interference call which is still debatable today. Others such as Ben Brush, Colin, Sarazen, Alsab, Grey Lag, Buckpasser, Riva Ridge, Foolish Pleasure, Alydar, Spectacular Bid, and Easy Goer, all of whom are now in the National Museum of Racing and Hall of Fame. Easy Goer ran the best Beyer Speed Figure performance (in the 1988 Champagne Stakes) by any 2-year-old since Beyer racing figures were first published.

The 1880 winner was Lady Rosebery, a horse owned by August Belmont, Sr. and named to honor England's Hannah Primrose, Countess of Rosebery whose family was prominent in British racing. Similarly, the 1950 winner was Uncle Miltie, a horse given the nickname of the famous comedian and New York City native, Milton Berle.

The inaugural running of the Champagne Stakes took place in 1867 at Jerome Park Racetrack prior where it remained through 1889. Shifted to the Morris Park Racecourse facility, it was held there through 1904. Moved to its present home at Belmont Park for the 1905 racing season, it was run at the Aqueduct Racetrack in 1959, from 1963 to 1967, and again in 1984.

Over the years, the Champagne Stakes has been raced over a variety of distances:
 Six furlongs : 1871–1889
 Seven furlongs : 1891–1904
 165 feet short of seven furlongs (Widener Course) : 1905–1932
 Six and one-half furlongs (Widener Course) : 1933–1939
 One mile : 1940–1983, 1985–1993; 2005 to present
 One and one-eighth miles : 1984
 One and one-sixteenth miles : 1994–2004

Records
Speed record:
 1:34.20 – Devil's Bag (1983)
 1:34.40 – Seattle Slew (1976)

Most wins by an owner:
 5 – Calumet Farm (1933, 1936, 1944, 1949, 1977)

Most wins by a jockey:
 5 – Braulio Baeza (1964, 1965, 1966, 1967, 1975)

Most wins by a trainer:
 6 – Todd A. Pletcher (2004, 2006, 2010, 2012, 2013, 2014)

Winners of the Champagne Stakes since 1946

In 1970, Hoist The Flag won the race but was disqualified and set back to last.
In 1972, Secretariat won the race but was disqualified and set back to second.
Due to a large field, in 1973 the race was run in two divisions.

Earlier winners 

1945 – Marine Victory
1944 – Pot O'Luck
1943 – Pukka Gin
1942 – Count Fleet
1941 – Alsab
1940 – Monday Lunch
1939 – Andy K.
1938 – Porter's Mite
1937 – Menow
1936 – Privileged
1935 – Brevity
1934 – Balladier
1933 – Hadagal
1932 – Dynastic
1931 – Sweeping Light
1930 – Mate
1929 – Whichone
1928 – Healy
1927 – Oh Say
1926 – Valorous
1925 – Bubbling Over
1924 – Beatrice
1923 – Sarazen
1922 – Nassau
1921 – Surf Rider
1920 – Grey Lag
1919 – Cleopatra
1918 – War Pennant
1917 – Lanius
1916 – Vivid
1915 – Chicle
1914 – Paris
1913 – Race Not Run
1912 – Race Not Run
1911 – Race Not Run
1910 – Race Not Run
1909 – Fauntleroy
1908 – Helmet
1907 – Colin
1906 – Kentucky Beau
1905 – Perverse
1904 – Oiseau
1903 – Stalwart
1902 – Meltonian
1901 – Endurance by Right
1900 – Garry Herrmann
1899 – Kilmarnock
1898 – Lothario
1897 – Plaudit
1896 – The Friar
1895 – Ben Brush
1894 – Salvation
1893 – Sir Excess
1892 – Ramapo
1891 – Azra
1890 – Hoodlum
1889 – June Day
1888 – Radiant
1887 – Cascade
1886 – Connemarra
1885 – Dew Drop
1884 – Eachus
1883 – Leo
1882 – Breeze
1881 – Macduff
1880 – Lady Rosebery
1879 – Carita
1878 – Belinda
1877 – Albert
1876 – Bombast
1875 – Virginius
1874 – Hyder Ali
1873 – Grinstead
1872 – Minnie W.
1871 – Grey Planet
1870 – Madam Dudley
1869 – Finesse
1868 – Cottrill
1867 – Sarah B.

See also
Road to the Kentucky Derby

References

1867 establishments in New York (state)
Horse races in New York (state)
Belmont Park
Morris Park Racecourse
Flat horse races for two-year-olds
Breeders' Cup Challenge series
Grade 1 stakes races in the United States
Graded stakes races in the United States
Recurring sporting events established in 1867